Lateral thinking is a manner of solving problems using an indirect and creative approach via reasoning that is not immediately obvious. It involves ideas that may not be obtainable using only traditional step-by-step logic. The term was first used in 1967 by Maltese psychologist Edward de Bono in his book The Use of Lateral Thinking. De Bono cites the Judgment of Solomon as an example of lateral thinking, where King Solomon resolves a dispute over the parentage of a child by calling for the child to be cut in half, and making his judgment according to the reactions that this order receives.  Edward de Bono also links lateral thinking with humour, arguing it entails a switch-over from a familiar pattern to a new, unexpected one.  It is this moment of surprise, generating laughter and new insight, which facilitates the ability to see a different thought pattern which initially was not obvious. According to de Bono, lateral thinking deliberately distances itself from the standard perception of creativity as "vertical" logic, the classic method for problem solving.

Critics have characterized lateral thinking as a pseudo-scientific concept, arguing de Bono's core ideas have never been rigorously tested or corroborated.

Methods 
Lateral thinking has to be distinguished from critical thinking. Critical thinking is primarily concerned with judging the true value of statements and seeking errors whereas lateral thinking focuses more on the "movement value" of statements and ideas. A person uses lateral thinking to move from one known idea to new ideas. Edward de Bono defines four types of thinking tools:
idea-generating tools intended to break current thinking patterns—routine patterns, the status quo
focus tools intended to broaden where to search for new ideas
harvest tools intended to ensure more value is received from idea generating output
treatment tools that promote consideration of real-world constraints, resources, and support

Random entry idea generation 
The thinker chooses an object at random, or a noun from a dictionary and associates it with the area they are thinking about. De Bono exemplifies this through the randomly-chosen word, "nose", being applied to an office photocopier, leading to the idea that the copier could produce a lavender smell when it was low on paper.

Provocation idea generation 

A provocation is a statement that we know is wrong or impossible but used to create new ideas. De Bono gives an example of considering river pollution and setting up the provocation, "the factory is downstream of itself", causing a factory to be forced to take its water input from a point downstream of its output, an idea which later became law in some countries. Provocations can be set up by the use of any of the provocation techniques—wishful thinking, exaggeration, reversal, escape, distortion, or arising. The thinker creates a list of provocations and then uses the most outlandish ones to move their thinking forward to new ideas.

Movement techniques 
The purpose of movement techniques is to produce as many alternatives as possible in order to encourage new ways of thinking about both problems and solutions. The production of alternatives tends to produce many possible solutions to problems that seemed to only have one possible solution. One can move from a provocation to a new idea through the following methods: extract a principle, focus on the difference, moment to moment, positive aspects or special circumstances.

Challenge 
A tool which is designed to ask the question, "Why?", in a non-threatening way: why something exists or why it is done the way it is. The result is a very clear understanding of "Why?", which naturally leads to new ideas. The goal is to be able to challenge anything at all, not those that are problematic. For example, one could challenge the handles on coffee cups: The reason for the handle seems to be that the cup is often too hot to hold directly; perhaps coffee cups could be made with insulated finger grips, or there could be separate coffee-cup holders similar to beer holders, or coffee shouldn't be so hot in the first place.

Concept formation 
Ideas carry out concepts. This tool systematically expands the range and number of concepts in order to end up with a very broad range of ideas to consider.

Disproving 
Based on the idea that the majority is always wrong (as suggested by Henrik Ibsen and by John Kenneth Galbraith), take anything that is obvious and generally accepted as "goes without saying", question it, take an opposite view, and try to convincingly disprove it. This technique is similar to de Bono's "Black Hat" of Six Thinking Hats, which looks at identifying reasons to be cautious and conservative.

Fractionation 
The purpose of fractionation is to create alternative perceptions of problems and solutions by taking the commonplace view of the situation and break it into multiple alternative situations in order to break away from the fixed view and see the situation from different angles, thus being able to generate multiple possible solutions that can be synthesized into more comprehensive answers.

Problem solving
 Problem solving
 When something creates a problem, the performance or the status quo of the situation drops. Problem-solving deals with finding out what caused the problem and then figuring out ways to fix the problem. The objective is to get the situation to where it should be. For example, a production line has an established run rate of 1000 items per hour. Suddenly, the run rate drops to 800 items per hour. Ideas as to why this happened and solutions to repair the production line must be thought of, such as giving the worker a pay raise. A study on engineering students' abilities to answer very open-ended questions suggests that students showing more lateral thinking were able to solve the problems much quicker and more accurately.

 Lateral problem "solving"
 Lateral thinking will often produce solutions whereby the problem appears as "obvious" in hindsight. That lateral thinking will often lead to problems that you never knew you had, or it will solve simple problems that have a huge potential. For example, if a production line produced 1000 books per hour, lateral thinking may suggest that a drop in output to 800 would lead to higher quality, and more motivated workers. Students have shown lateral thinking in their application of a variety of individual, unique concepts in order to solve complex problems.

See also

 Cognitive Research Trust
 Derailment (thought disorder)
 Serendipity
 Thought (outline)
 Convergent thinking
 Creativity techniques
 Brainstorming
 Divergent thinking
 Critical thinking
 Data thinking
 Higher-order thinking
 Problem solving
 Lateral thinking related
 Oblique Strategies
 Parallel thinking
 Provocative operation
 Six Thinking Hats
 Thinking outside the box
 Vertical thinking
 Reason
 Logical reasoning
 Abductive reasoning
 Deductive reasoning
 Inductive reasoning
 Strategic thinking

References

Further reading

External links

Creativity
Imagination
Inductive reasoning
Innovation
Mental processes
Problem solving skills
Reasoning
Synchronicity
Systems thinking
Thought